Meri Kristiina Mäkelä (born 20 November 1992) is a Finnish athlete whose specialty is the triple jump. She has competed in two Olympics and four World Athletics Championships, with the best result of 9th in 2022 . Her personal bests in the event are 14.64 m outdoors (achieved in 2022 in Munich, Germany) and 14.38 m indoors (2019, Gallur, Madrid, Spain).

Competition record

References

External links
 

1992 births
Living people
Finnish female triple jumpers
World Athletics Championships athletes for Finland
People from Orimattila
Athletes (track and field) at the 2016 Summer Olympics
Olympic athletes of Finland
Finnish Athletics Championships winners
Athletes (track and field) at the 2020 Summer Olympics
Sportspeople from Päijät-Häme
European Athletics Championships medalists